Presidente Olegário is a municipality in the north of the Brazilian state of Minas Gerais.

Presidente Olegário belongs to the Paracatu statistical microregion. It became a municipality in 1938.

Neighboring municipalities are: Lagamar, Lagoa Grande, Patos de Minas, Varjão de Minas, João Pinheiro and São Gonçalo do Abaeté.

The main economic activities are cattle raising (118,000 head in 2006) and farming. There was also production of charcoal from eucalyptus plantations. This charcoal is transported to the industrial region near Belo Horizonte to be used in the steel and iron industry. The GDP was R$169,963,000 (2005). There were two banking agencies in 2006. Around 6,500 people were involved in the agricultural sector. There were 439 tractors, a ratio of one tractor for every 40 farms. The main crops were cotton, rice, sugarcane, beans, tomatoes, soybeans, and corn. In the health sector there were 10 health clinics and one hospital with 20 beds.

The score on the Municipal Human Development Index was 0.721.  This ranked Presidente Olegário 457 out of 853 municipalities in the state, with Poços de Caldas in first place with 0.841 and Setubinha in last place with 0.568.

References

External links
Prefeitura municipal —a professional site with music and a video

See also
List of municipalities in Minas Gerais

Municipalities in Minas Gerais